This page details the records, statistics, and other achievements pertaining to Larry Bird.

NBA career statistics

Regular season

|-
| style="text-align:left;"| 
| style="text-align:left;"| Boston
| 82 || 82 || 36.0 || .474 || .406 || .836 || 10.4 || 4.5 || 1.7 || .6 || 21.3
|-
|  style="text-align:left; background:#afe6ba;"| †
| style="text-align:left;"| Boston
| 82 || 82 || 39.5 || .478 || .270 || .863 || 10.9 || 5.5 || 2.0 || .8 || 21.2
|-
| style="text-align:left;"| 
| style="text-align:left;"| Boston
| 77 || 58 || 38.0 || .503 || .212 || .863 || 10.9 || 5.8 || 1.9 || .9 || 22.9
|-
| style="text-align:left;"| 
| style="text-align:left;"| Boston
| 79 || 79 || 37.7 || .504 || .286 || .840 || 11.0 || 5.8 || 1.9 || .9 || 23.6
|-
|  style="text-align:left; background:#afe6ba;"| †
| style="text-align:left;"| Boston
| 79 || 77 || 38.3 || .492 || .247 || style="background:#cfecec;"| .888 || 10.1 || 6.6 || 1.8 || .9 || 24.2
|-
| style="text-align:left;"| 
| style="text-align:left;"| Boston
| 80 || 77 || style="background:#cfecec;"| 39.5 || .522 || .427 || .882 || 10.5 || 6.6 || 1.6 || 1.2 || 28.7
|-
|  style="text-align:left; background:#afe6ba;"| †
| style="text-align:left;"| Boston
| 82 || 81 || 38.0 || .496 || .423 || style="background:#cfecec;"| .896 || 9.8 || 6.8 || 2.0 || .6 || 25.8
|-
| style="text-align:left;"| 
| style="text-align:left;"| Boston
| 74 || 73 || style="background:#cfecec;"| 40.6 || .525 || .400 || style="background:#cfecec;"| .910 || 9.2 || 7.6 || 1.8 || .9 || 28.1
|-
| style="text-align:left;"| 
| style="text-align:left;"| Boston
| 76 || 75 || 39.0 || .527 || .414 || .916 || 9.3 || 6.1 || 1.6 || .8 || 29.9
|-
| style="text-align:left;"| 
| style="text-align:left;"| Boston
| 6 || 6 || 31.5 || .471 || ... || .947 || 6.2 || 4.8 || 1.0 || .8 || 19.3
|-
| style="text-align:left;"| 
| style="text-align:left;"| Boston
| 75 || 75 || 39.3 || .473 || .333 || style="background:#cfecec;"| .930 || 9.5 || 7.5 || 1.4 || .8 || 24.3
|-
| style="text-align:left;"| 
| style="text-align:left;"| Boston
| 60 || 60 || 38.0 || .454 || .389 || .891 || 8.5 || 7.2 || 1.8 || 1.0 || 19.4
|-
| style="text-align:left;"| 
| style="text-align:left;"| Boston
| 45 || 45 || 36.9 || .466 || .406 || .926 || 9.6 || 6.8 || .9 || .7 || 20.2
|- class=sortbottom
| style="text-align:left;" colspan=2| Career
| 897 || 870 || 38.4 || .496 || .376 || .886 || 10.0 || 6.3 || 1.7 || 0.8 || 24.3
|-

Playoffs

|-
| style="text-align:left;"| 1980
| style="text-align:left;"| Boston
| 9 || 9 || 41.3 || .469 || .267 || .880 || 11.2 || 4.7 || 1.6 || 0.9 || 21.3
|-
|  style="text-align:left; background:#afe6ba;"| 1981†
| style="text-align:left;"| Boston
| 17 || 17 || 44.1 || .470 || .375 || .894 || 14.0 || 6.1 || 2.3 || 1.0 || 21.9
|-
| style="text-align:left;"| 1982
| style="text-align:left;"| Boston
| 12 || 12 || 40.8 || .427 || .167 || .822 || 12.5 || 5.6 || 1.9 || 1.4 || 17.8
|-
| style="text-align:left;"| 1983
| style="text-align:left;"| Boston
| 6 || 6 || 40.0 || .422 || .250 || .828 || 12.5 || 6.8 || 2.2 || 0.5 || 20.5
|-
|  style="text-align:left; background:#afe6ba;"| 1984†
| style="text-align:left;"| Boston
| style="background:#cfecec;"| 23 || style="background:#cfecec;"| 23 || 41.8 || .524 || .412 || .879 || 11.0 || 5.9 || 2.3 || 1.2 || 27.5
|-
| style="text-align:left;"| 1985
| style="text-align:left;"| Boston
| 20 || 20 || 40.8 || .461 || .280 || .890 || 9.1 || 5.8 || 1.7 || 1.0 || 26.0
|-
|  style="text-align:left; background:#afe6ba;"| 1986†
| style="text-align:left;"| Boston
| 18 || 18 || 42.8 || .517 || .411 || .927 || 9.3 || 8.2 || 2.1 || .6 || 25.9
|-
| style="text-align:left;"| 1987
| style="text-align:left;"| Boston
| style="background:#cfecec;"| 23 || style="background:#cfecec;"| 23 || style="background:#cfecec;"| 44.1 || .476 || .341 || .912 || 10.0 || 7.2 || 1.2 || 0.8 || 27.0
|-
| style="text-align:left;"| 1988
| style="text-align:left;"| Boston
| 17 || 17 || 44.9 || .450 || .375 || .894 || 8.8 || 6.8 || 2.1 || 0.8 || 24.5
|-
| style="text-align:left;"| 1990
| style="text-align:left;"| Boston
| 5 || 5 || 41.4 || .444 || .263 || .906 || 9.2 || 8.8 || 1.0 || 1.0 || 24.4
|-
| style="text-align:left;"| 1991
| style="text-align:left;"| Boston
| 10 || 10 || 39.6 || .408 || .143 || .863 || 7.2 || 6.5 || 1.3 || 0.3 || 17.1
|-
| style="text-align:left;"| 1992
| style="text-align:left;"| Boston
| 4 || 2 || 26.8 || .500 || .000 || .750 || 4.5 || 5.3 || 0.3 || 0.5 || 11.3
|- class=sortbottom
| style="text-align:left;" colspan=2| Career
| 164 || 162 || 42.0 || .472 || .321 || .890 || 10.3 || 6.5 || 1.8 || 0.9 || 23.8
|-

Career stats

Regular season
Games: 897

Win-Lost: 660-237

Points: 21791

Rebounds: 8974

Assist: 5695

Playoffs
Games: 164

Win-Lost: 99-65

Points: 3897

Rebounds: 1683

Assist: 1062

All-star games
Games: 10

Win-Lost: 7-3

Points: 134

Rebounds: 79

Assist: 41

40 point games

Regular season
Bird scored 40 or more points 47 times in the regular season.

*Ejected with 1:38 remaining in the third quarter

Playoffs
Bird scored 40 or more points five times in the playoffs.

Game-winners

Regular season
Bird had 15 game-winners in the regular season.

Playoffs
Bird had two game-winners in the playoffs.

Career highs

Regular season

Playoffs

Records
Most games shooting perfectly from the three-point line and free throw line
broken by Stephen Curry

Only known NBA player to record at least:
28 points, 19 rebounds, 15 assists, 3 steals and 3 blocked shots in a game
15 rebounds, 11 assists and 6 steals without a turnover in a game (at Utah Jazz, January 1, 1983)
39 points and 7 assists while shooting 81% from the field and perfectly from the foul line in a game (at Atlanta Hawks, April 5, 1983)
Roger Brown did this in the ABA on March 16, 1971.
60 points, 7 rebounds, 3 assists and 92% free throw percentage in a game
53 points, 8 rebounds, 70% shooting from the field and 100% shooting from the foul line in a game
50 points, 13 rebounds, 7 assists and 75% shooting from the field in a game
42 points, 20 rebounds, 5 assists and 100% free throw percentage in a game
42 points, 20 rebounds, 3 steals and 100% free throw percentage in a game
42 points, 20 rebounds, 2 blocked shots and 100% free throw percentage in a game
42 points, 20 rebounds, 100% free throw percentage and 2 or less turnovers in a game
42 points, 20 rebounds, 3 steals and 62.5% shooting from the field in a game
42 points, 20 rebounds, 5 assists and 62.5% shooting from the field in a game
45 points, 8 rebounds, 8 assists and 5 blocked shots in a game
45 points, 8 rebounds, 5 blocked shots and 100% free throw percentage in a game
49 points, 14 rebounds, 12 assists and 4 steals in a game
49 points, 14 rebounds, 12 assists and one blocked shot in a game
49 points, 14 rebounds, 12 assists and 5 or less turnovers in a game
49 points, 14 rebounds, 12 assists and 54% shooting from the field in a game
49 points, 14 rebounds, 12 assists and 90% free throw percentage in a game
49 points, 12 assists, 4 steals and 54% shooting from the field in a game
49 points, 12 assists, 4 steals and 90% free throw percentage in a game
49 points, 12 assists, 5 or less turnovers and 90% shooting from the foul line in a game
21 points, 8 steals and 12 rebounds while shooting perfectly from the foul line in a game
12 rebounds, 10 assists, 8 steals and one blocked shot in a game
29 points, 8 steals and 10 rebounds while shooting 60% from the field in a game
30 points, 9 steals, 2 blocked shots and 12 rebounds in a game
30 points, 9 steals, 2 blocked shots and 10 assists in a game
9 steals, 2 blocked shots, 12 rebounds and 10 assists in a game
30 points, 9 steals, 12 rebounds and 10 assists in a game
36 points, 19 rebounds, 6 steals and 3 blocked shots in a game

One of two known NBA players to record at least:
49 points, 12 rebounds, 7 assists and 2 blocked shots in a game
other player is Michael Jordan (November 20, 1992 at Los Angeles Lakers)
49 points, 14 rebounds, 4 steals and 54% shooting from the field in a game
other player is Michael Jordan (twice; February 12, 1985 and March 28, 1990)
49 points, 12 assists, 4 steals and one blocked shot in a game
other player is Russell Westbrook (April 19, 2017)
49 points, 12 assists, 4 steals and 5 or less turnovers in a game
other player is Russell Westbrook (April 19, 2017)
49 points, 12 assists, one blocked shot and 54% shooting from the field
other player is James Harden (January 27, 2017)
49 points, 12 assists, one blocked shot and 90% shooting from the foul line
other player is James Harden (January 27, 2017)
19 rebounds, 6 steals, 3 blocked shots and 3 or less turnovers in a game
other player is Michael Cage (April 19, 1988)
21 points, 8 steals, 12 rebounds and 10 assists
Bird did this twice (February 18, 1985 and October 25, 1985)
other player is Fat Lever (November 24, 1987)

One of three known NBA players to record at least:
39 points, 7 assists and 2 steals while shooting 81% from the field in a game (at Atlanta Hawks, April 5, 1983)
other players are Gail Goodrich (November 25, 1973) and Terry Porter (May 19, 1992 - 1992 NBA Playoffs)

References

Bird, Larry